The Brazilian ironclad Brasil was an armored corvette built in France for the Brazilian Navy in the mid-1860s. Configured as a central-battery ironclad, she served during the 1864–70 War of the Triple Alliance between Brazil, Argentina and Uruguay against Paraguay.

Design and description
Concerned about the construction of ironclad warships in Europe and North America, the Imperial Brazilian Minister of the Navy, Rear Admiral Joaquim Raimundo de Lamare, sent a small mission to Europe to study the latest advances in armor and steam propulsion technology. Upon its return in March 1863, it brought back plans and estimates for a small armored corvette as well as river gunboats to be built in France.

The ship had a simple single-expansion steam engine, rated at 250 nominal horsepower, that used steam generated by two boilers to drive a single four-bladed propeller. The ship carried  of coal although nothing is known about her range or endurance.

The ship was armed with four 70-pounder Whitworth rifled muzzle-loading guns and four smoothbore 68-pounder guns.

Construction and service
Brasil, named for the nation, was ordered on 5 January 1864 from the French shipbuilding company Forges et Chantiers de la Méditerranée. She cost £60,000 which was raised by popular subscription. The ship was laid down at the company's La Seyne-sur-Mer shipyard later in the year and launched on 23 December. She was completed on 2 March 1865.

Footnotes

References

External links
 Brief history of Brasil 

Ships built in Brazil
Corvettes of the Brazilian Navy
Ironclad warships of the Brazilian Navy
1864 ships